Ennodius may refer to:

Ennoius, proconsul of Africa in 395
Felix Ennodius, proconsul of Africa c. 420
Ennodius Messala, Roman senator, consul in 506
Magnus Felix Ennodius, bishop of Pavia 514–521
Ennodius (beetle), leaf beetles in the subfamily Eumolpinae